Dorit Rabinyan (born September 25, 1972) is an Israeli writer and screenwriter.

Biography
She was born in Kfar Saba, Israel, to an Iranian-Jewish family. She has published three novels, two of which have been widely translated. She has also published a poetry collection and an illustrated children's book. She also writes for television. Her first novel, Persian Brides, won the Jewish Quarterly-Wingate Prize in 1999.

She was a close friend of Palestinian artist Hasan Hourani, and wrote a eulogy for him in The Guardian after his death in 2003.

Her 2014 novel, Gader Haya (initially known as Borderlife in English, later published as All the Rivers), which tells a love story between an Israeli woman and a Palestinian man, has become the center of controversy. The novel was well-received and won the Bernstein Prize. In 2015, a committee of teachers requested Borderlife be added to the recommended curriculum for Hebrew high school literature classes. 

A committee in the Israeli Ministry of Education found the book inappropriate and declined to add it, on the grounds, according to The Economist, that it promotes intermarriage and assimilation. Dalia Fenig, the leading committee member, argued that the book "could do more harm than good" at this time of heightened tensions, though she noted the book was not banned and could be added next year. The decision led to protests from high school teachers and principals and opposition politician Isaac Herzog. Sales of the book surged in the aftermath of the ban.

In 2000, and again in 2002, Rabinyan was awarded the Prime Minister's Prize for Hebrew Literary Works.

Books
Yes, Yes, Yes (poetry), 1991 [כן, כן, כן Ken, Ken, Ken], 
Persian Brides (novel), 1995 [סמטת השקדיות בעומריג'אן Simtat Ha-Shkediyot Be-Oumrijan], translated into English, 1998, 
Our Weddings (Strand of a Thousand Pearls) (novel), 1999 [החתונות שלנו Ha-Chatunot Shelanu], translated into English, 2001, 
And Where Was I? (picture book), 2006 [אז איפה הייתי אני Az Eifo Hayiti Ani?]
Gader Haya ("Hedgerow" - English title: All the Rivers, novel), 2014 [גדר חיה Gader Chaya]

References

External links
 
 Water Breaking at The Short Story Project, full text story
 official website, the Israeli author Dorit Rabinyan

1972 births
Living people
People from Kfar Saba
International Writing Program alumni
Israeli novelists
Israeli female screenwriters
Israeli women novelists
Israeli Sephardi Jews
Israeli people of Iranian-Jewish descent
Israeli Mizrahi Jews
Bernstein Prize recipients
20th-century novelists
21st-century novelists
20th-century Israeli women writers
21st-century Israeli women writers
Recipients of Prime Minister's Prize for Hebrew Literary Works